The XX Racquetball European Championships were held in Hamburg, (Germany) from September 05 to 07 2019, with four men's national teams and two women's national teams in competition. One senior and junior competition could be held as well.

The venue was the Sport & Spa Jenfeld Club in Hamburg, with 2 regulation racquetball courts. The 4 men's teams were Germany, Ireland, Italy and The Netherlands and the 3 women's teams were Germany, Ireland and the Netherlands. Team France dropped out to an injured player only a few days before the beginning of the competition. In total, 6 nations competed in the Individual competition with players from Germany, Ireland, Italy, Lithuania, Poland and The Netherlands.

Men's national teams competition

September 5th, 2019

Men's teams final standings

Women's national teams competition

Women's teams final standings

Men's Single competition

Women's Single competition

Men's Doubles competition

Women's Doubles competition

See also
European Racquetball Championships

References

External links
Team Standings  ERF website
Men's singles results
Ladies singles results
Mens doubles results
Ladies doubles results

European Racquetball Championships
Racquetball
2019 in German sport
Racquetball in Germany
International sports competitions hosted by Germany